Terminatrix may refer to:

 T-X, a fictional character in the film Terminator 3: Rise of the Machines
 Ravonna, a fictional character in the Marvel Comics universe
 , a 1995 Japanese film starring Kei Mizutani

See also 
 Lady Terminator, a 1989 Indonesian film
 Terminator (disambiguation)